"I Will Run to You" is a song by the American singer/songwriter Stevie Nicks, with Tom Petty and the Heartbreakers, from her second solo album The Wild Heart (1983). The song peaked at No. 35 on the U.S. Billboard Top Tracks chart. The track was never released as a single in the United States.

Charts

Notes and references

 Timespace: The Best of Stevie Nicks, liner notes
 The Wild Heart, liner notes

External links
 stevienicksofficial.com

1983 songs
Stevie Nicks songs
Tom Petty songs
Song recordings produced by Jimmy Iovine
Songs written by Tom Petty
Male–female vocal duets